The Southern Mindoro (South Mangyan) languages are one of two small clusters of Austronesian languages spoken by the Mangyan people of Mindoro Island in the Philippines. They make up a branch of the Greater Central Philippine subgroup.

The languages are Buhid, Tawbuid, and Hanuno'o.

These are among the few languages of the Philippines which continue to be written in indigenous scripts, though mostly for poetry.

See also
Northern Mindoro languages
Ratagnon language

References

Further reading
Barbian, Karl-Josef. 1977. The Mangyan languages of Mindoro. Cebu City: University of San Carlos.
Zorc, R. David. 1972. Taubuid (Batangan) notes.
Zorc, R. David. 1972. Hanunoo (Bukid) notes.
Zorc, R. David. 1972. Hanunoo (Mansalay) notes.

 
Greater Central Philippine languages
Mindoro